Anil Menon is a lieutenant colonel in the United States Air Force, emergency medicine physician, and NASA astronaut candidate. 

He was a medical director at NASA and SpaceX before being selected as a candidate for an astronaut at NASA.

Early life and education
Menon was born and raised in Minneapolis, Minnesota to Ukrainian and Indian immigrants. Menon graduated from Saint Paul Academy and Summit School in Saint Paul, Minnesota, in 1995. He received Bachelor’s Degree in Neurobiology from Harvard University, Cambridge, Massachusetts in 1999. At Harvard, Menon conducted research on Huntington's disease. He later spent a year in India as a Rotary Ambassadorial Scholar to study and supported a Polio vaccination drive. 

He attended Stanford Medical School in 2004 where he studied engineering and medicine and worked on coding soft tissue at NASA Ames Research Center, Silicon Valley, California. During his residency training in 2012 for emergency medicine, Menon joined the California Air National Guard and gained experience in wilderness medicine through support for remote adventure races like Racing The Planet.

Air Force career

Anil Menon was transferred to the 173rd Fighter Wing for military duty and pursued a residency in aerospace medicine at UTMB-Galveston, where he published his thesis on medical kits for commercial spaceflight. During his aerospace training, he deployed twice with the U.S. Air Force critical care air transport team to treat and transport wounded warriors. He later transferred to the Air Force reserves, 45th operational group, Detachment 3 of the 45th Space Wing to provide medical direction for launch and landings.

Flight Surgeon career

Air Force
Menon is an actively practicing emergency medicine physician with fellowship training in wilderness and aerospace medicine. As a physician, he was a first responder and joined the International Medical Corps in 2010 during the 2010 earthquake in Haiti, 2015 earthquake in Nepal, and the 2011 Reno Air Show accident. In the Air Force, Menon supported the 45th Space Wing as a flight surgeon and the 173rd Fighter Wing, where he logged over 100 sorties in the F-15 fighter jet and transported over 100 patients as part of the critical care air transport team.

NASA
 
Menon started as a NASA flight surgeon in 2014. He supported four long-duration crew members on the International Space Station as the deputy crew surgeon for Soyuz missions Soyuz TMA-13M and Soyuz TMA-17M and prime crew surgeon for Soyuz MS-06 . As a member of the Human Health and Performance Directorate, he also served as the medical lead for the health maintenance system and direct return aircraft development. He lived and worked in Star City, Russia, for more than six months.

SpaceX Medical Director
Anil Menon joined the SpaceX in April 2018 as their first flight surgeon. He was present at four Crew Dragon missions from SpaceX Demo-2 through Inspiration4, especially at the times of recovery and crew suit-up. In this way he helped to launch the company's first humans to space during NASA’s SpaceX Demo-2 mission as well as first civilians on Inspiration4 mission and building a medical organization to support the human system during future missions such as Starship. 
After rejoining NASA as a astronaut candidate, he left SpaceX in December 2021.

NASA astronaut career

In December 2021, Menon was selected as an NASA astronaut. Menon reported for duty in January 2022 and is currently undergoing two years of initial astronaut training as a NASA astronaut candidate.

Upon completion, he could be assigned to missions that involve performing research aboard the International Space Station as well as deep space missions to destinations including the Moon on NASA's Orion spacecraft and Space Launch System rocket.

Personal life
He is married to Anna Menon, who is a Lead Space Operations Engineer at SpaceX and a spaceflight crew member, under Jared Isaacman's Polaris program. They have two children. Both he and his wife appeared in the final episode of the five-episode television documentary entitled Countdown: Inspiration4 Mission to Space, released on Netflix in September 2021.

References

1976 births
Living people
Astronaut candidates
Astronaut High School alumni
Harvard University alumni
NASA people
People from Minneapolis
SpaceX people
Stanford University School of Medicine alumni
United States Air Force astronauts